Muhammad Rijal (born 25 May 1986) is an Indonesian badminton player from PB Djarum club.

Career 
Rijal captured his first international badminton title in mixed doubles with  partner Vita Marissa at the 2008 Japan Super Series, beating fellow Indonesians Nova Widianto/Lilyana Natsir in the final round.

Personal life 
When he was young, he joined the Djarum Kudus badminton club. His parents' names are Ibrahim Martin (father) and Imas Riyati (mother). His hobby is football. Generally people called him Rizal. His name usually spelled as Rijal instead of Rizal. His family is Sundanese, however because his first club was Djarum, he represented East Java in Indonesia National Sport Game. Now he is engaged in business in the sale of sports equipment and production of the shuttlecock.

Participation at Indonesian Team 
 1 time at Sudirman Cup (2007)

Achievements

Asian Championships 
Mixed doubles

Southeast Asian Games 
Mixed doubles

World Junior Championships 
Mixed doubles

BWF Superseries (1 title, 2 runners-up) 
The BWF Superseries, which was launched on 14 December 2006 and implemented in 2007, is a series of elite badminton tournaments, sanctioned by the Badminton World Federation (BWF). BWF Superseries levels are Superseries and Superseries Premier. A season of Superseries consists of twelve tournaments around the world that have been introduced since 2011. Successful players are invited to the Superseries Finals, which are held at the end of each year.

Mixed doubles

  BWF Superseries Finals tournament
  BWF Superseries Premier tournament
  BWF Superseries tournament

BWF Grand Prix (3 titles, 5 runners-up) 
The BWF Grand Prix had two levels, the BWF Grand Prix and Grand Prix Gold. It was a series of badminton tournaments sanctioned by the Badminton World Federation (BWF) which was held from 2007 to 2017.

Mixed doubles

  BWF Grand Prix Gold tournament
  BWF Grand Prix tournament

BWF International Challenge/Series (1 title, 1 runner-up) 
Mixed doubles

  BWF International Challenge tournament
  BWF International Series tournament

Other Tournaments 

Men's doubles

Mixed doubles

Performance timeline

National team 
 Senior level

Individual competitions 
 Junior level

 Senior level

References

External links 
 
 Profile at the badmintonindonesia.org

1986 births
Living people
People from Tangerang
Sportspeople from Banten
Indonesian male badminton players
Competitors at the 2011 Southeast Asian Games
Competitors at the 2013 Southeast Asian Games
Southeast Asian Games gold medalists for Indonesia
Southeast Asian Games bronze medalists for Indonesia
Southeast Asian Games medalists in badminton